Helena Cholewicka (1848 – 1883), was a Polish ballet dancer. She belonged to the more well known ballet dancers in Poland during her career.

She was engaged in the Ballet at the National Theatre, Warsaw between 1862 and 1881. She was the first Polish ballerina to be made Prima ballerina assoluta.

References 

 Źródło: Słownik Biograficzny Teatru Polskiego 1765-1965, PWN Warszawa 1973

1848 births
19th-century Polish ballet dancers
1883 deaths